Deadly Power is an adventure for fantasy role-playing games published by Mayfair Games in 1984.

Plot summary
Deadly Power is a scenario for character levels 6-9 in which the adventurers must solve an ancient riddle to find some legendary golden seeds.

In Deadly Power, two factions are at odds in the mining town of Shallotville, and they are both after the same prize.  The prize is a box of magic seeds which are rumored to give the possessor unbelievable power.  The warrior Mynor Yelad wants to recruit the player characters to retrieve the seeds, claiming they were intended for him by his father.  However, current ruler Queen Enaj wants the player characters to bring the seeds to her so she can destroy them, and she swears that Mynor's intentions are thoroughly evil.

Publication history
Deadly Power was written by Laurel Nicholson and others, and was published by Mayfair Games in 1984 as a 40-page book. Deadly Power was designed by Laurel Nicholson, John Keefe, and Donald Nicholson.  Deadly Power is one of Mayfair's Role Aids modules intended for Dungeons & Dragons or similar systems.

Reception
Rick Swan reviewed the adventure in The Space Gamer No. 72. He stated that "Although the quest for the seeds is the heart of Deadly Power, it's the sorting out of these allegiances that gives it a special flavor and depth." He commented that "like the other modules in the RoleAids series, it's a qualify effort both in execution and premise.  The quest for the seeds requires four separate steps to complete, and even though each step is fairly involved, smooth play is insured by thorough descriptions and instructions from the GM. [...] The uncertainty of exactly who's on your side and who isn't adds a nice edge to the proceedings.  With a lot of action and hair-raising encounters (including a trip through Hell), it's unlikely that even the most jaded of roleplayers will lose interest with Deadly Powers.  He continued: "A more benevolent GM might want to defuse some of the harsher encounters before running the adventure.  At one point, for instance, a character becomes permanently evil just for touching a harmless-looking staff; at another, the same thing happens just for trying on a helmet.  The GM will also need to supply a fair amount of transitional information as it's often hard to tell exactly how the party is supposed to get from one location to the next.  Better maps would have helped, and so would additional NPCs to guide adventurers who stray too far."  Swan concluded his review by saying: "But these few rough spots are easily cleaned up with a little advance preparation.  Overall, Deadly Power is a nice blend of puzzle solving and swordplay, intense from beginning to end.  Recommended for the courageous."

References

Fantasy role-playing game adventures
Role Aids
Role-playing game supplements introduced in 1984